Sugar palm is a common name for several species of palms used to produce sugar. 

Species used include:
Arenga pinnata (syn. A. saccharifera)
Borassus flabellifer
Caryota
Caryota urens
Cocos nucifera

See also
Toddy palm
Palm sugar